Posterity Records was a Canadian record label established by Harvey Glatt, that was started in 1963 and existed, in corporate form, from 1975 to 1981.

History
Harvey Glatt, an Ottawa-based music manager, promoter, retailer and radio station owner, formally established Posterity Records in 1976, following a 1963 release, under the Posterity label, of a record by Canadian poet Irving Layton.  During its approximate six-year existence in the 1970s and early 1980s, the label released records by Lenny Breau, the Downchild Blues Band, Ian Tamblyn, and others. It was distributed by Glatt-owned TCD Records and Tapes, short for "Treble Clef Distribution".  During this period, the label also distributed, as Posterity-Woodshed, records produced by Woodshed Records, a private label owned by Canadian singer-songwriter and producer David Essig.  Included in Posterity-Woodshed releases was the seminal album, Blackie and the Rodeo King, by Willie P. Bennett, released in 1978.  Posterity Records ceased issuing new releases in 1981 and assigned its distribution rights to Phonodisc Limited, at the time Canada's largest independent manufacturer and distributor of records and tapes.  The Posterity-Woodshed label continued to issue new releases until Posterity Records completely ceased operations in 1984.  Woodshed Records was thereafter reestablished by David Essig as a separate entity.

Posterity Records' first release was a recording of poet Irving Layton reading at Le Hibou Coffee House in 1963, produced by William Hawkins, with liner notes by Roy MacSkimming.  Layton was reading from his book A Red Carpet From The Sun.

Album releases

Posterity

1981 Joe Hall & The Continental Drift Rancho Banano
1980 Figgy Duff Figgy Duff
1979 Nighthawks  Side Pocket Shot
1979 Noel Harrison Mount Hanley Song
1979 Lenny Breau Five O'Clock Bells
1979 Heaven's Radio Uptown Babies
1979 Roddy Ellias A Night For Stars 
1979 Quarrington/Worthy  Quarrington/Worthy 
1978 Ian Tamblyn Closer To Home 
1978 Heaven's Radio Active  
1978 Tony Quarrington The Anthony B. Quarrington Limitation Presents...Top Ten Written All Over It
1978 Cody A Tale Of Three Cities 
1978 Joe Hall & The Continental Drift On The Avenue 
1977 Downchild Blues Band So Far - A Collection Of Our Best
1976 Doug McArthur Sisteron
1976 Ian Tamblyn  Ian Tamblyn
1963 Irving Layton Live at Le Hibou

Posterity-WoodshedDiscography of Willie P. Bennett; www.marcogiunco.com.  Retrieved 2014-01-10.Woodshed Records Album Releases; rateyourmusic.  Retrieved 2014-01-11

1983 David Essig While Living The Good Years
1979 Bill Garrett Bill Garrett
1978 Humber Valley River Boys  Bar Room Daze
1978 David Essig Sequence
1978 Willie P. Bennett Blackie and the Rodeo King
1977 Willie P. Bennett Hobo's Taunt
1977 Margaret Christl Jockey to the Fair
1976 Original Sloth Band Hustlin' & Bustlin'''
1976 David Essig Stewart Crossing1975 David Essig High Ground  
1975 Willie P. Bennett Tryin' to Start Out Clean1975 David Essig Redbird Country''

References

Record labels established in 1976
Defunct record labels of Canada
Canadian independent record labels